The Mask Singer is a Thai singing competition program presented by Kan Kantathavorn. It aired on Workpoint TV every Thursday at 20:00 from 6 October 2016 to 30 March 2017.

Panel of Judges

First round

Group A

Group B

Group C

Group D

Semi-final

Group A

Group B

Group C

Group D

Final

Champ VS Champ

Champ of the Champ

Celebration of The Mask Champion

Elimination table

Ratings

References

The Mask Singer (Thai TV series)
2016 Thai television seasons
2017 Thai television seasons